Azampur Football Club Uttara, commonly known as AFC Uttara, is an association football club based in Azampur, Uttara, a suburb of Dhaka, Bangladesh. The club plays in the Bangladesh Premier League, having gained promotion at the end of 2021–22 Championship League season.

History

Formation and early years
In 2009, Azampur Club was built next to the Azampur railway line by renting the land owned by Bangladesh Railway. The club is located at the end of Road No. 19, Sector 4, Uttara. Local businessmen Shahidur Rahman Manik and Md Shahadat Hossain were respectively named the club's president and secretary. The club remained inactive in the domestic football scene during the first decade since inception and much of the club's time in the lower tiers remains unrecorded.

Azampur, took part in the 2018–19 Dhaka Second Division Football League, which is the fourth tier of Bangladeshi football. Although Azampur, failed to finish within the top three spots required for promotion to the Dhaka League, the club were given a direct entry to the  Bangladesh Championship League, the country's second tier.

Match-fixing allegations and promotion
In preparation for the 2021–22 Bangladesh Championship League, the club appointed former Bangladesh national team forward Saifur Rahman Moni, as the head coach. Although the club were given direct entry to the secon-tier due to their facilities, it was later reported that the club house had inhumane living standards, with 15 and 14 in two rooms, used to accommodate 25 players. Azampur's inaugural match in the BCL, ended with a 3–0 victory over Wari Club.

On 27 March 2022, Saifur Rahman Moni resigned from head coach duty, and imposed match-fixing allegations against the club. Moni stated that his last two games with the club, against Uttara FC (1–2) and Farashganj SC (3–1) were predetermined. After the allegations were made public, a player anonymously interviewed by Prothom Alo, admitted to the game being fixed, while Muktijoddha SKC midfielder Salahuddin Rubel, was also rumored to be involved. The club's players also accused Salahuddin Rubel of entering the clubhouse without permission.

Amdist the allegations Monowar Hossain Moyna, who was appointed from matchday nine of the league season, guided the club to promotion to the Bangladesh Premier League. After almost 5 months of investigating, the Bangladesh Football Federation concluded that the club had not taken part in any fixed matches, thus allowing them entry into the 2022–23 Bangladesh Premier League.

Players

First-team squad

Current technical staff
As of 7 November 2022

Club officials
As of January 2022

Head coaches' record

References

Football clubs in Bangladesh
Sport in Bangladesh
Uttara
Association football clubs established in 2009
2009 establishments in Bangladesh